Stephen or Steven Greene may refer to:
Stephen Greene (politician) (born 1949), Canadian politician
Stephen Greene (artist) (1917–1999), American artist
Stephen Greene (social entrepreneur), CEO of the media company Rockcorps
Stephen Greene, pseudonym of director David O. Russell much in the vein of Alan Smithee
Steven Greene (born 1982), former Australian rules footballer

See also
Steven Green (disambiguation)